The Port Talbot & District Football League, also known as the Port Talbot Football League is a league competition featuring non-professional association football clubs in the area of Port Talbot, South Wales. Founded in 1926, it is one of the oldest such competition in Wales.   The main competition consists of one division, which splits midway through into two conferences which are named "Premier League" & "Division One" . The Premier League is a feeder to the South Wales Aance League Division Two, and therefore sits at tier 7 of the Welsh football pyramid.

Background 
The league is currently one division which splits at the midway point. The split consists of the Port Talbot Premier League, followed by the Port Talbot Division One.

The League is administered by Mr. Mr T. Lewis (Chairman), Mr A. Short (Vice Chairman), Mr B. Owen (Treasurer) and Mr. David King (General Secretary).

Among the clubs who have progressed to a higher level from the Port Talbot Football League is Goytre United,  Cornelly United and Tata Steel.

Member clubs for 2021–22 season
The following reflect the post mid-season split.

Premier League

Afan United
Cornelly United
Croeserw Athletic
Cwmafan
FC Porthcawl
Gwynfi United
Margam YC

Division One

Afan United Reserves
Cornelly United reserves
Cwmafan reserves
FC Porthcawl reserves
Kenfig Hill
Porthcawl Town Athletic reserves
Porthcawl Town Athletic thirds
Port Talbot Town thirds

Divisional history - Premier Division champions 

1994–95: Trefelin BGC
2006-07: Real Bay View CF
2007–08: Grove Park
2008–09: Real Bay View CF
2009–10: Cornelly United
2010–11: Cwmafan
2011–12: Cornelly United
2012–13: Margam YC
2013–14: Glyncorrwg 
2014–15: Goytre United reserves
2015–16: Cwmafan
2016–17: Cwmafan
2017–18: Cwmafan
2018–19: Tata Steel United
2019–20: Glyncorrwg 
2020–21: No competition
2021–22: Margam YC

References

Football leagues in Wales
Sport in Port Talbot